The 2017 Tibor Zsíros Férfi Magyar Kupa was the 51st season of the Hungarian Basketball Cup. Alba Fehérvár won its 4th national Cup championship. Péter Lóránt was named Most Valuable Player.

Qualification
Eight highest ranked teams after the first half of the 2016–17 NB I/A regular season qualified to the tournament.

Alba Fehérvár
Egis Körmend
ZTE KK
Falco-V. Energia KC Szombathely
PVSK-PANNONPOWER
Kaposvári KK
Szolnoki Olaj KK
Naturtex-SZTE-Szedeák

Bracket

Matches

Quarterfinals

Semifinals

Bronze medal match

Final

See also
 2016–17 Nemzeti Bajnokság I/A

References

External links
 Official website
 Hungarian Basketball Federaration
 bb1.hu

Magyar Kupa men